Syed Ali Urooj Naqvi (Urdu: سید علی عروج نقوی) (born March 19, 1977) is a former Pakistani cricketer who played five Tests from 1997 to 1998. A right-handed batsman, who scored his only century in Tests on his debut Test itself, 115 against South Africa at Rawalpindi in 1997 in which another debutant Azhar Mahmood also scored a century, thus this two became the only debutant pair to score a century in the same test. He was a regular part-time off spin bowler at first-class level.

References

1977 births
Living people
Muhajir people
Pakistan Test cricketers
Cricketers who made a century on Test debut
Pakistani cricketers
Karachi Blues cricketers
Pakistan Customs cricketers
Pakistan National Shipping Corporation cricketers
Islamabad cricketers
Khan Research Laboratories cricketers
Lahore Blues cricketers
Abbottabad cricketers
Pakistani cricket coaches
Cricketers from Lahore
People from Lahore